Blueskin may refer to:

Blueskin (horse). one of George Washington's favorite war horses
Blueskin Bay, an estuary and rural district in New Zealand
The Blueskins, a band from West Yorkshire
Blueskin seabream (Polysteganus coeruleopunctatus), a species in the Polysteganus genus
Acacia irrorata, an Acacia species colloquially known as "blueskin"
The Andorians in the Star Trek series
Joseph Blake (criminal), nicknamed "Blueskin"
A character in Gideon the Cutpurse

See also
Blue skin (disambiguation)